David Scott Armstrong (born July 9, 1966) is a Canadian politician, who was elected as a Conservative member to represent the electoral district of Cumberland—Colchester—Musquodoboit Valley in the federal by-elections on November 9, 2009. He served until his defeat in the 2015 election.

After his defeat in the 2015 election, Armstrong was appointed as the official opposition critic on Atlantic Canadian issues and ACOA and was the only official opposition critic who was not a member of parliament.

On September 15, 2016, it was announced that Armstrong would be returning to full-time teaching and would relinquish his posts with the Conservative Party.

Background
Armstrong graduated from Cobequid Education Centre in 1984. He graduated from Acadia University with a Bachelor of Arts. He then went on to earn a Master of Social Science Education from Florida State University study at the University of Southern Mississippi as well.

Armstrong has served as a school administrator for over 15 years. Armstrong was principal at Tatamagouche Elementary School in the early 2000s. He was also principal at Truro Elementary School in 2008 and 2009. After his election defeat in 2015 Armstrong returned to his career as an educator. He served as Principal at Great Village Elementary School in 2016/2017, Principal of Debert Elementary 2017/2018, Principal of South Colchester Academy (High School) 2018/2019, Principal of Debert Elementary 2019/2020, and South Colchester Academy 2020/2021.

Personal life
Armstrong is married to Tammy Stewart.

Community involvement
Armstrong is a volunteer on the Children's Aid Society Board and the Hospital Foundation Board. Armstrong is a former president and longstanding volunteer of the Progressive Conservative Party of Nova Scotia, and volunteer with the Conservative Party.

Political career
Following Bill Casey's resignation in April 2009, as the Member of Parliament for Cumberland-Colchester-Musquodoboit Valley, Armstrong was nominated as the Conservative Party candidate for the byelection to replace him. On November 9, 2009, Armstrong won the byelection, receiving 45.8% of the vote. He was re-elected in the 2011 federal election, receiving 52.5% of the vote. In September 2012, Armstrong was named chairman of the federal Conservative Atlantic caucus, replacing New Brunswick MP Mike Allen. In the 2015 federal election, Armstrong was defeated by Liberal Bill Casey.

40th Parliament

Armstrong served as a member on the Standing Committee on Environment and Sustainable Development, the Standing Joint Committee on the Library of Parliament, the Standing Joint Committee on Scrutiny of Regulations and the Standing Committee on Canadian Heritage.

During the 40th Parliament, Armstrong sponsored a Private Member's Bill, Bill C-636 – An Act Respecting the Marine Mammals Regulations (Seal Fishery Observation Licence). The bill would have increased the distance that a person must maintain from another person who is fishing for seals. Bill C-636 did not go beyond first reading.

41st Parliament

Armstrong served as a member on the Legislative Committee on Bill C-11, the Standing Committee on Government Operations and Estimates and its Subcommittee on Agenda and Procedure, the Standing Committee on Canadian Heritage and its Subcommittee on Agenda and Procedures, the Standing Committee on Procedure and House Affairs and its Subcommittee on Private Members' Business, the Standing Committee on Justice and Human Rights, the Standing Committee on Human Resources, Skills and Social Development and Status of Persons with Disabilities, and its Subcommittee on Agenda and Procedure.

Armstrong served as Member of Panel of Chairs from September 28, 2011 to September 13, 2013.

Armstrong was appointed Parliamentary Secretary to the Minister of Employment and Social Development on September 19, 2013.

Post parliamentary career
After his defeat and because the Conservatives did not elect a single MP in the 32 seats of Atlantic Canada during the 2015 election, Armstrong was appointed Official Opposition Critic for Atlantic Canada and ACOA by Acting Conservative Leader of the Opposition Rona Ambrose. Armstrong was the only Official Opposition critic who was not a member of either the House of Commons or the Senate.

Armstrong worked as a paid staffer in the office of the Leader of the Opposition and spent his time between Ottawa and Atlantic Canada but was based in Nova Scotia. The position paid approximately $60,000 per year out of Ambrose's office budget. He spoke for the Conservatives on the region.

On September 15, 2016, Armstrong relinquished his position with Ambrose's office and as critic to return to full-time teaching.

He re-contested the riding of Cumberland—Colchester in the 2019 federal election but lost.

Electoral record

References

External links

1966 births
Acadia University alumni
Canadian people of Scottish descent
Conservative Party of Canada MPs
Florida State University alumni
Living people
Members of the House of Commons of Canada from Nova Scotia
People from Truro, Nova Scotia
University of Southern Mississippi alumni
Canadian schoolteachers
21st-century Canadian politicians